Yang Fujia (11 June 1936 – 17 July 2022) was a Chinese nuclear physicist. He was an academician of the Chinese Academy of Sciences, a renowned nuclear physicist and a Chancellor of the University of Nottingham, England. He was President of the University of Nottingham Ningbo China (UNNC).

Biography
Yang's ancestral hometown is Zhenhai, Zhejiang. He was born in Shanghai, graduated from Shanghai Gezhi High School and obtained a degree in physics from Fudan University. He was a lecturer and professor of physics at Fudan, serving as President of the university from 1994 to 1999.

Yang was Director of the Shanghai Institute of Nuclear Research of the Chinese Academy of Sciences from 1987 to 2001, was Chairman of the Shanghai Science and Technology Association (1992–1996), and he was the first president of the Association of University Presidents of China (1997–1999).

Yang has held visiting professorships at the Niels Bohr Institute in Denmark; Rutgers University, US; the State University of New York at Stony Brook, US; and the University of Tokyo, Japan.  He held honorary degrees from Soka University of Japan, the State University of New York, the University of Hong Kong, the University of Nottingham, England; and the University of Connecticut, US.

Yang was installed as the University of Nottingham's sixth Chancellor on 4 July 2001, the first time that a Chinese academic has become Chancellor of a UK university. He stepped down on 1 January 2013 and was succeeded by Sir Andrew Witty.

In 2004, Yang was one of the 3 prime movers behind the creation of the University of Nottingham Ningbo China – along with Sir Colin Campbell and Madame Xu Yafen. He continued to hold the office of President at UNNC, presiding at Graduation Ceremonies and engaging closely with students who have followed Yang's original dream of moderating and reforming China's higher education circumstance.

Other roles which Professor Yang has held include:

 Council Member representing China on the Association of East Asia Research Universities
 Member of the International Association of University Presidents
 Member of the Association of University Presidents of the Pacific Rim
 Vice-president of the Chinese Association of Science and Technology
 Member of International Advisory Council in Universiti Tunku Abdul Rahman

Yang died in Shanghai on 17 July 2022 at the age of 86.

Notable Research

References

 Introduction to Prof. Yang, University of Nottingham
 Sir Andrew Witty takes over as Chancellor

1936 births
2022 deaths
Chinese nuclear physicists
Educators from Shanghai
Fudan University alumni
Academic staff of Fudan University
Members of the Chinese Academy of Sciences
People associated with the University of Nottingham
Physicists from Shanghai
Presidents of Fudan University
University of Copenhagen alumni
Members of the 9th Chinese People's Political Consultative Conference
Members of the 10th Chinese People's Political Consultative Conference